This article is intended to be a comprehensive list of all prime ministers, grouped by political affiliation.

Prime ministers by political affiliation

Christian Democrat
Thirty-six Christian Democrats have served as prime minister, either as being considered Catholic, or as a member of the Catholic Party, the PSC-CVP, the CVP, or the CD&V.

 Étienne de Gerlache (27 February – 10 March 1831)
 Felix de Muelenaere (24 July 1831 – 20 October 1832)
 Barthélémy de Theux de Meylandt (4 August 1834 – 18 April 1840, 31 March 1846 – 12 August 1847, 7 December 1871 – 21 August 1874)
 Pierre de Decker (30 March 1855 – 9 November 1857)
 Jules d'Anethan (2 July 1870 – 7 December 1871)
 Jules Malou (21 August 1874 – 19 June 1878, 16 June – 26 October 1884)
 Auguste Beernaert (26 October 1884 – 26 March 1894)
 Jules de Burlet (26 March 1894 – 25 February 1896)
 Paul de Smet de Naeyer (25 February 1896 – 24 January 1899, 5 August 1899 – 2 May 1907)
 Jules Vandenpeereboom (24 January – 5 August 1899)
 Jules de Trooz (2 May – 31 December 1907) 
 Frans Schollaert (9 January 1908 – 17 June 1911)
 Charles de Broqueville (17 June 1911 – 1 June 1918, 22 October 1932 – 20 November 1934)
 Gérard Cooreman (1 June – 21 November 1918)
 Léon Delacroix (21 November 1918 – 20 November 1920)
 Henri Carton de Wiart (20 November 1920 – 16 December 1921)
 Georges Theunis (16 December 1921 – 13 May 1925, 20 November 1934 – 25 March 1935)
 Aloys Van de Vyvere (13 May – 17 June 1925)
 Prosper Poullet (17 June 1925 – 20 May 1926)
 Henri Jaspar (20 May 1926 – 6 June 1931)
 Jules Renkin (6 June 1931 – 22 October 1932)
 Paul van Zeeland (25 March 1935 – 24 November 1937)
 Hubert Pierlot (22 February 1939 – 12 February 1945)
 Gaston Eyskens (11 August 1949 – 8 June 1950, 26 June 1958 – 25 April 1961, 17 July 1968 – 26 January 1973)
 Jean Duvieusart (8 June – 16 August 1950)
 Joseph Pholien (16 August 1950 – 15 January 1952)
 Jean Van Houtte (15 January 1952 – 23 April 1954)
 Théo Lefèvre (25 April 1961 – 28 July 1965)
 Pierre Harmel (28 July 1965 – 19 March 1966)
 Paul Vanden Boeynants (19 March 1966 – 17 July 1968, 20 October 1978 – 3 April 1979)
 Leo Tindemans (25 April 1974 – 20 October 1978)
 Wilfried Martens (3 April 1979 – 31 March 1981, 17 December 1981 – 7 March 1992)
 Mark Eyskens (31 March – 17 December 1981)
 Jean-Luc Dehaene (7 March 1992 – 12 July 1999)
 Yves Leterme (20 March – 30 December 2008, 25 November 2009 – 6 December 2011)
 Herman Van Rompuy (30 December 2008 – 25 November 2009)

Liberal
Twelve Liberals have served as prime minister, either as being considered Liberal, or as a member of the Liberal Party, the VLD, or the MR.

 Joseph Lebeau (28 March – 21 July 1831, 18 April 1840 – 13 April 1841)
 Albert Goblet d'Alviella (20 October 1832 – 4 August 1834)
 Jean-Baptiste Nothomb (13 April 1841 – 30 July 1845)
 Sylvain Van de Weyer (30 July 1845 – 31 March 1846)
 Charles Rogier (12 August 1847 – 31 October 1852, 9 November 1857 – 3 January 1868)
 Henri de Brouckère (31 October 1852 – 30 March 1855)
 Walthère Frère-Orban (3 January 1868 – 2 July 1870, 19 June 1878 – 16 June 1884)
 Paul-Émile Janson (24 November 1937 – 15 May 1938)
 Guy Verhofstadt (12 July 1999 – 20 March 2008)
 Charles Michel (11 October 2014 – 27 October 2019) 
 Sophie Wilmès (27 October 2019 – 1 October 2020)
 Alexander De Croo (1 October 2020 – present) [incumbent]

Social Democrat
Five Social Democrats have served as prime minister, either as a member of the BWP-POB, the BSP-PSB, or the PS.

 Paul-Henri Spaak (15 May 1938 – 22 February 1939, 13 March – 31 March 1946, 20 March 1947 – 11 August 1949)
 Achille Van Acker (12 February 1945 – 13 March 1946, 31 March – 3 August 1946, 23 April 1954 – 26 June 1958)
 Camille Huysmans (3 August 1946 – 20 March 1947)
 Edmond Leburton (26 January 1973 – 25 April 1974)
 Elio Di Rupo (6 December 2011 – 11 October 2014)

Graphical timeline

See also

 Prime Minister of Belgium
 List of Belgian prime ministers by time in office
 Politics of Belgium

References

List of Prime Ministers by political affiliation
List of Prime Ministers by political affiliation
Prime Ministers by political affiliation
Political